The Atom (Raymond "Ray" Palmer) is a superhero appearing in American comic books published by DC Comics. The character was created by editor and co-plotter Julius Schwartz, writer Gardner Fox and penciler Gil Kane. The Atom was one of the first superheroes of the Silver Age of Comic Books and debuted in Showcase #34 (October 1961).

The Atom has been played in various TV series by Alfie Wise and John Kassir. He was played by Brandon Routh in Legends of Tomorrow in the shared DC Arrowverse on The CW. His character first appeared in the third season of Arrow.

Publication history
The Atom debuted in Showcase #34 (cover-dated Oct. 1961) from the DC Comics precursor, National Comics. Early comics-fandom pioneer Jerry Bails wrote to the National Comics editor Julius Schwartz in December 1960 outlining an updated version of Al Pratt, the company's 1940s Golden Age Atom. Bails and future Marvel Comics editor-in-chief Roy Thomas collaborated on a suggested version that incorporated elements of a Golden Age hero, Quality Comics' Doll Man. Eventual Atom writer Gardner Fox wrote Bails on January 1, 1961, stating that Schwartz passed along Bails' letter to him.

Schwartz wrote Bails on January 6 saying he had already been planning a new version of the Atom, in the vein of National's reimagined Golden Age superheroes the Flash and Green Lantern, and had already asked artist Gil Kane to sketch designs. Kane, unaware of Bails' suggestions, said he did "a series of drawings" on large illustration boards, including a depiction of the new Atom riding a German shepherd dog and another of a pistol firing at the Atom, who wore the costume he eventually would in his comic debut but without a belt. Kane, who lived in Jericho, New York, on Long Island, at the time, drove to the nearby Hicksville home of DC production person Tom Nicolosi, who colored the drawings using St. Martin's dyes. Schwartz, after seeing the drawings, had the belt added, a detail Kane said he disliked since "it broke up the costume lines." Schwartz said he had not wanted to reuse the Golden Age Atom, Al Pratt, and had read about dwarf stars and thought a fragment of one could power the new hero's miniaturization. He added that he and Fox together plotted the early stories of this new Silver Age Atom. Fox said in 1979, "I doubt that any feedback from Bails or Thomas had very much of an influence, though always kept their ideas in the back of our minds."

His alter ego, Ray Palmer, is an homage to science-fiction magazine editor Raymond A. Palmer.

Fictional character biography

Silver Age
Raymond "Ray" Palmer, is a physicist and professor at Ivy University in the fictional city of Ivy Town, somewhere in New England, specializing in matter compression as a means to fight overpopulation, famine and other world problems. Using a mass of white dwarf star matter he finds after it lands on Earth, Palmer fashions a lens that enables him to shrink any object to any degree he wishes. Compression destabilizes an object's molecular structure, however, causing it to explode.

During a spelunking expedition, Palmer and his students, along with his girlfriend, lawyer Jean Loring, find themselves trapped in a cave. In desperation, Palmer secretly uses the lens he has carried with him to shrink himself to be able to climb through a small opening in the fallen rocks sealing the cave, knowing he will likely explode. Using a diamond engagement ring, Palmer enlarges the hole sufficiently and descends to the floor to try to alert the others of the escape route before dying. However, upon entering the lens' beam, he finds himself returned to normal size and without danger of exploding. As the lens is covered with cave moisture, Palmer believes this has altered the beam to allow this strange effect. When subsequent experiments still result in objects exploding, Palmer concludes some unknown force in his own body allows him to safely size-shift. He decides to use this effect to become a superhero. A retcon in Brightest Day: The Atom Special (July 2010) removes the influence of his exotic physical makeup, tying his survival instead to the discovery of a compression matrix, a fabric able to spread the effects of the ray on the entire body, stabilizing it. The prototype matrix later became his costume.

Palmer creates a belt tool to control his miniaturization to subatomic size with an emergency backup mechanism in his gloves, and develops a costume that he can wear at most times that only becomes visible when he shrinks significantly. In addition, he develops equipment that allows him to decrease his weight in addition to his size, allowing him to glide on air currents on a low setting, while a high setting allows him to handle or strike objects with the equivalent strength of his normal size and build. A favorite travel method is to call some location on the telephone and when the phone is answered, Palmer can shrink enough to travel through the phone lines in seconds to emerge out the answering phone.

He carries out the bulk of his early superheroic adventures in Ivy Town, where he often helps his girlfriend, Jean Loring, win her cases. Much later, he gains the innate equivalent powers within his own body.

Palmer has fought against several alien and supernatural threats, as well as having his own rogues gallery: his arch enemy is Chronos the Time Bandit, the menace of the Bug-Eyed Bandit, the dangerous eco-terrorist Floronic Man, and the miniature misguided Bat-Knights of Elvaran. He also had several time travel adventures by means of Professor Alpheus V. Hyatt's Time Pool. The Atom is a member of several incarnations of the Justice League, and the team is gracious enough to supply a special chair scaled to his default size which can elevate to whatever height needed so he can easily partake in team meetings without having to go out of costume. There, he meets Hawkman (Katar Hol pre-Hawkworld, Carter Hall post-Hawkworld), one of his closest friends in the superhero community. Neither character achieved major popularity, and even in their heyday were mostly supporting characters, often with Palmer as a specialist in size alteration who was often needed to access extremely confined areas only he could access. Hawkman would manufacture prosthetic wings for a myna Ray saved, taking on the name Major Mynah and became the Atom's partner and steed.

Sword of the Atom, Power of the Atom, and Teen Titans

The Atom had one short-lived miniseries and three subsequent specials, all titled Sword of the Atom, in which Palmer abandons civilization after divorcing his wife Jean, who had an affair with fellow lawyer Paul Hoben, and becomes the hero of a tribe of six-inch (152 mm) -tall yellow-skinned humanoid aliens called Morlaidhans in the jungles of South America. He also becomes consort to their princess, Laethwyn. Palmer bequeathes his size-changing belt and role as Ivy Town's protector to Jean's new husband, Hoben. During this time, Palmer's friend Norman Brawler pens the book The Atom's Farewell, in which he reveals Palmer's identity as the Atom.

Eventually the colony is destroyed, despite Palmer's attempt to save it, by a group associated with the US Government acting as loggers. Palmer is forced to escape via the telephone to North America. In the attempt, he fails to anticipate that the connection will involve satellite relay and the unexpectedly arduous trip causes him to remain at approximately three feet high and without his costume's size changing equipment.

With the help of a friend, Ray creates a new costume from the material of the white dwarf star. This time, instead of a belt, Palmer uses an encephalotronic grid in the costume's headpiece to control the costume. The grid is keyed to his unique brainwaves. This enables him to transfer his mass into an unknown dimension which allows him to alter his size and weight just by thinking about it. He can even make the new costume appear or disappear with a thought by shifting most of its atoms to or from the other dimension. This allows him to be in costume while at full height or to shrink without having to have his costume appear. He can even increase his weight while remaining six inches (152 mm) tall or reduce his weight while remaining at full size. Ray often does this and is then light enough to ride wind currents, where he actually appears to be flying to a limited degree. Palmer also develops a mental link with the white dwarf matter to which he has been regularly exposed. Most of the mass lies within another dimension. Ray can draw upon that mass and hit with a super-concussive force. He has been shown to punch through concrete walls, crush an exam table and break the axle of a car that is moving at high speed.

Palmer would learn of those behind the genocide of the Morlaidhans, namely five CIA operatives, part of a group called the Cabal. In a mission called Operation: Fireball, the tiny aliens were murdered in hopes Ray would return as the Atom and become a tool for the Cabal (as Ray worked for the CIA in his earlier years). Instead, Palmer shrank the five agents to six-inch height and the CIA would employ them as a group called Micro/Squad. The Atom would take on new enemies during this period, such as Humbug, a sentient robot in control of an army of duplicates of itself, and Strobe, a technological armor-clad crook. Micro/Squad would also return, attempting to murder Palmer for what he did to them. Instead, teammate Ginsburg dies in the explosion they set and Ray approaches Adam Cray about becoming the new Atom to bring the remaining Micro/Squad into the open. Cray agrees, steals Paul Hoben's size-changing belt, and joins the Suicide Squad. The plan works as the villains emerge and Palmer takes the place of operative Sting; but their leader, Blacksnake, kills Cray and takes the belt for himself, returning to normal height. Blacksnake murders the remaining members of his crew as Ray arrives, revealing himself, posing as Sting, and battles him. After Blacksnake is defeated, the Cabal employs Task Force X II to murder him to protect their secrets.

Later, during the events of Zero Hour, Palmer is rejuvenated to a teenage state and develops the ability to grow in height in addition to his previous abilities, all of which he was capable of controlling innately without using his white dwarf star-based equipment. He becomes field leader of a new group of Teen Titans, composed of hybrids of human beings and the H'San Natall, after a chance meeting with Isaiah Crockett on his first day attending Ivy University. As a former member of the Justice League, Palmer viewed his affiliation with the Teen Titans as a step backward. The group primarily battled the Veil, an anti-alien organization that employed Deathstroke and Dark Nemesis, but it's revealed that their leader Pylon was actually a H'San Natall. They would also face Jugular (hired by the H'San Natall) and Loren Jupiter's son Jarrod, aka Haze. The Atom's new growth powers were instrumental in the battle against Sekhmet of the Millennium Giants. Ray subsequently regains his original age and memories and loses his new powers after he begins to rapidly age and Waverider has to use DNA taken prior to his rejuvenation to restore him to his original state. Palmer returns to his teaching job at Ivy University, but also becomes an associate and alternate member of the JLA. With his exit from the Teen Titans, the group disbands. One notable student under Palmer was Ronnie Raymond, who, without the knowledge of elements of Martin Stein, found difficulty in fully employing his abilities as Firestorm.

Identity Crisis and Countdown 

In the 2004-05 limited series Identity Crisis, Jean Loring kills Sue Dibny, the wife of the Elongated Man. After stealing some of the Atom's shrinking technology and his costume, she kills Sue in a misguided attempt to win Palmer back. She also arranges a hit on Tim Drake's father which is carried out by Captain Boomerang (Digger Harkness). The intent is for Jack Drake to kill some random attacker, but both manage to kill each other. After committing her to Arkham Asylum, Palmer shrinks himself to microscopic size and disappears.

Palmer eventually meets up with his old friend Carter Hall after microscopically traveling through phone lines. He warns Hall of the consequences of mindwiping Batman and of harassing criminals over a crime that is perpetrated by Jean, one of their own. Palmer explains he needs time away, and shrinks himself again after Hall agrees to keep the meeting secret.

His legacy lived on, however. Ryan Choi, a student of physics in Hong Kong who corresponded with Ray Palmer via mail in the past, found a copy of his costume and shrinking device to become the current Atom. Around this same time, an unnamed teenager with powers similar to Palmer joins the Teen Titans under the name Molecule. After a brief tenure with the team, he is later killed during a confrontation with the Terror Titans.

During the missing year, Palmer's technology is employed by Supernova to shrink and grow in size to enter and exit the bottle city of Kandor.

DC Comics would not reveal Palmer's whereabouts since his disappearance at the end of Identity Crisis. However, Palmer returned to play a very important role in the Countdown limited series. A Monitor asks the Source Wall what is the solution to "the great disaster," it answers "Ray Palmer". Subsequently, Kyle Rayner, Donna Troy and Jason Todd scour the Multiverse for the former Atom, who just might hold the key to saving reality from a crisis of unparalleled proportions."

In their travels, the quartet has found people marked with the Atom's familiar symbol. The group tracks Palmer to Earth-51, where he assumes the life of its native Palmer after his life is cut short during his studies of the Multiverse and discovery of the looming Crisis. Meeting the Jean of Earth-51 and the Justice League again for the first time, Palmer is found on a world where the heroes have been able to eradicate supercrime and create a utopian Earth (later revealed to have been the result of this reality's Batman murdering all of this world's super-criminals after the Joker killed Jason Todd). However, once Kyle, Donna, Jason and Bob the Monitor are able to track him down, Bob attempts to kill Palmer; with the Challengers' help, Palmer escapes and reveals to the Challengers that it was the Ray Palmer of Earth-51 who was meant to stop the Great Disaster and that he had been trying to carry on his work, to no avail.

When the Challengers return to their own Earth, Jimmy Olsen is kidnapped by Mary Marvel, who has been corrupted by Darkseid. Palmer hitches a ride from within Jimmy. When Darkseid takes control of Jimmy's powers, Palmer locates and shuts down the control sphere inside Jimmy's brain, but is then swarmed by Apokoliptian antibodies. While escaping this onslaught, Palmer discovers the "battery" containing the New God spirit energies. Palmer removes it from Jimmy's head and shatters it, releasing the energies.

Palmer later (after much cajoling) joins Donna, Kyle, and Forager in their new mission as border guards to the Multiverse, realizing that there is nothing left for him on Earth anymore. However, Palmer returns home to New Earth one more time, upon realizing that his old nemesis Chronos had taken his identity to mislead a young pretender to his identity, Ryan Choi. After helping his successor to once again save Ivy Town, he returns to the Multiverse with a new sense of fulfillment, leaving his town in the hands of a new, capable hero.

During the Final Crisis, Palmer returns to New Earth and works with Choi again to aid in the efforts to evacuate the last free humans.

In the Justice League: Cry for Justice mini-series, it has been confirmed that Palmer will become a member of Hal Jordan's new Justice League.

Blackest Night

On the night of the superhero's memorial day, Palmer asks Hawkman to visit Jean's grave to be honored as a fallen member of the community, but Hawkman refuses because of what she did in Identity Crisis. Palmer is later shown speaking to Hawkman again, over the phone (unaware that his friend has been killed and reanimated as a Black Lantern). Atom is then invited to visit undead Hawkman to discuss his heartache over his wife. Palmer is later revealed to have shrunk into Hawkman's ring, escaping certain death. Joining the battle between Hal Jordan, Barry Allen, and the Black Lanterns, Palmer is set upon by Black Lanterns Ralph and Sue Dibny, who use his guilt over Jean's actions to try to feed on his compassion-filled heart. Palmer is saved from death by the Indigo Tribe, who combine their light with Hal's to destroy the Dibnys and their rings. During the crisis, Palmer was able to deduce with the heroes that the black rings are simulations taking the identities of the deceased and needing to feed. The Indigo Tribe take the heroes to the Hall of Justice, unceremoniously taking Hal Jordan and abandoning the rest when the Black Lanterns renew their attack.

Palmer helps the heroes escape via a phone line, and then brings them to the JSA, who were also being attacked by Black Lanterns. During the crisis, Palmer meets Damage, son of Al Pratt, the first hero to be called Atom. The two heroes briefly acquainted during the battle, and begin to develop a friendship. Palmer stopped the Black Lantern Al Pratt from killing Damage, but was unable to keep the reanimated Jean from finishing the job. Palmer made a futile attempt to stop one of the black rings from turning Damage's corpse into an undead before Jean used his own technology to shrink him, Mera, and herself into the fully transformed Damage's ring. As Palmer and Mera battle Jean inside the black ring, Jean reveals Nekron's plan along showing what is happening at Coast City, as deceased residents and revived heroes arise as Black Lanterns under the demon lord's commands. Deadman witnesses their battle and plans to rescue Palmer and Mera from Jean. Deadman saves Palmer and Mera by briefly possessing Jean, allowing them to escape and join the heroes against Nekron and his army. During the battle, Palmer is chosen as a deputy officer of the Indigo Tribe to be more effective against Nekron's forces. Although the Indigo Tribe eschews formal uniforms for tribal patterns over simple garments, Ray Palmer's costume is turned into a close approximation of the tattered Sword of the Atom clothings he had used in the past.

Palmer's past is rehashed, showing that he never quite got over Jean, even during the days of Sword of the Atom. Indigo-1 claims that she can teleport the armies of each Lantern Corps onto Earth, if given time to meditate. The responsibility falls to Palmer to protect her while she does so. Before she enters her trance, she reveals to Palmer that the indigo staff and his overwhelming compassion allows him to mimic the other powers of the Lantern Corps; she demonstrates this by temporarily becoming a Red Lantern and vomiting corrosive blood all over an attacking company of Black Lanterns. She then enters her trance, while Palmer fights off Black Lanterns Hawkman and Hawkgirl by temporarily becoming an Orange Lantern, loudly proclaiming "I want my friends back!" He then summons two orange energy duplicates of Khufu and Chay-Ara to help him fight off his and Indigo-1's attackers. He is briefly successful. But then Jean shows up to torment him, and she leaps into Indigo-1's ring. Palmer follows her. He ends up reliving Sue Dibny's death, and is then attacked by various Black Lantern Morlaidhans, the minuscule race he befriended during Sword of the Atom. He fights them off and, summoning the powers of a Green Lantern, destroys Jean. Indigo-1 manages to summon the various armies and thanks Palmer for his help. He tells her to keep his involvement in the deployment of the troops a secret, and asks that she help him find a way to legitimately resurrect Hawkman and Hawkgirl.

In the final battle, Palmer gets his wish when Hawkman and Hawkgirl are brought back to life by power of white light at the end of the Blackest Night series. Ray's involvement of secret resurrect remains unknown.

Brightest Day and Adventure Comics co-feature
In July 2010 Ray Palmer had a Brightest Day one-shot that led to a co-feature in Adventure Comics. Written by Jeff Lemire with art by Mahmud Asrar, the co-feature focused on Ray Palmer's early life. For a brief three-issue tenure, Palmer was part of writer James Robinson's new Justice League line-up, but resigned to help his friend Martin Stein with some sort of project. At the start of the Brightest Day event, Ray and Stein are seen at the funeral of Gehenna, the girlfriend and partner of the second Firestorm, Jason Rusch. When Jason gets into a confrontation with Ronnie Raymond over Gehenna's death, Ray steps in and tries to stop it. Ray manages to separate Jason and Ronnie from Black Lantern constructs.

Afterward, Ray discovered his father was attacked and the suspect was his own uncle David. With Ray's father in the hospital, Ray discovers his father had a stroke and his investigation of technology had been stolen. He seeks out Oracle to find the Calculator, Oracle manages to trace a data line, and Ray enters through the internet where he then encounters the Calculator and interrogates him to find out the dealers are. However, Calculator creates a room with no oxygen to make Atom's heartrate slower and he attempts to kill the Atom. Ray manages to grab Calculator and shrinks to return to Oracle's base. While Ray is in remission, he threatens Calculator who tells him that something called the Colony has manipulated Ray. Later, Prof. Hyatt was attacked by the Colony while looking for white dwarf matter. When Ray arrives, he goes to rescue Prof. Hyatt. During the fight, the Colony dies by incineration from the white dwarf matter. Ray calls Oracle to trace the phone line, and while he arrives at the Colony's base he is confronted by the Colony squad.

After failing to avoid detection, he is confronted by Uncle David and with his help, pulls him away from the Colony heading towards the teleporter. Once safe, Uncle David tells Ray about the Colony. David also tells Ray that he could not leave and could not work on the projects on his own, he shows Ray how to travel using the astrology orb called the ant farm to see a mini-planet of microscopic nature. But, the Colony followed them to David's hideout and travels to the ant farm Ray then engages them in an epic battle. After the battle the Colony died from incineration as it did before but, Ray managed to save him using his stable white dwarf matter. Ray demanded to know what they desired and the Colony tells him the same thing, and they transport the ant farm to the Colony's base. He destroys Ray's belt buckle's white dwarf matter and kills himself. Since they cannot return, Ray follows David with a backup plan when suddenly Ray is approached by robotic insects. David explains that the robotic insects are caretakers. They manage to fix the belt buckle and he returns to normal size when in Colony's base. Failing to escape, Ray is forced by the scientist to bring the white dwarf matter. He shows the monitor renderings where Colony is standing in front of the hospital where is father his and he is going to kill him.

When Ray refused, Hawkman prevents Colony from attacking Ray's father. Ray receives a call from Oracle to trace the monitor renderings, but Hawkman is being attacked by the Colony squad that miniaturize into Hawkman's body. Ray chooses to save Hawkman to leave the Colony's base while the other Colony escapes and kidnaps Ray's father. Ray rescues Hawkman by leaping into a body of the Colony attackers. When Hawkman is recovering, the Colony leaves their message to bring the white dwarf meteor and warned him no tricks, and to bring the meteor to save his family. While Ray traded the meteor to Colony before the Colony leaves, they exchange it for Ray's family that is in the ant farm. Ray travels into the ant farm and discovers that they planted a nuclear bomb on a vest strapped to his uncle David. Ray then manages to save his father and David and shrinks the bomb before it had a chance to detonate. While Ray's father is recovering, Ray reveals to David that he planted the white dwarf meteor into a nano-liquid to make the Colony's headquarters shrink. Ray, David, and Hawkman arrive at the location of the Colony's headquarters to attack their base. After the Colony was defeated however, David tells him there are more Colonies in the area. Later, Ray returns his father home. Ray forgives his father and apologizes for giving him a rough life before he overhears a firefighter rescue service, as he is a capable hero once more.

During this same period, Ray begins an investigation into the disappearance of Ryan, whom unbeknownst to the superhero community, had been murdered by Deathstroke. Ray comforts Ryan's girlfriend Amanda, and muses Ryan may be hiding out like Ray did after the events of Identity Crisis. While he shrinks himself to investigate he discovers microbiology blood. He arrives at the Hall of Justice to tell the League members that Ryan is missing. The League starts to help Ray's investigation to find Ryan's whereabouts. He discovers Ryan's DNA cell is not a match. The DNA cell came to someone else. Later, Ray discovers evidence that Dwarfstar had a hand in Ryan's death, and vows to find him and make him pay. Ray eventually finds Dwarfstar in a hospital, where he is recovering from the severe injuries he sustained from his torture at the hands of Giganta (Ryan's ex-girlfriend). Believing it may lead to a lighter sentence, Dwarfstar confesses to hiring Deathstroke to kill Ryan. Armed with this knowledge, Ray leaves to inform the Justice League. Later, he asked Batman (Dick Grayson) to get revenge on Deathstroke for murdering Ryan. Ray and the Justice League arrive to attempt to arrest Deathstroke and the Titans. The Justice League battle against the Titans in Khandaq, where Ray seriously injures Deathstroke for killing his friend. The battle is stopped by Isis, who forces the Justice League to flee to avoid restarting World War III. After failing, Ray begins writing the eulogy for Ryan's funeral, and is comforted by Superman. In the final issue, Ray meets Ryan's friends and family, and gives the speech at his protégé's funeral.

Convergence
In the Convergence crossover, when the alternate Brainiac miniaturized the universe of the New Earth, Ray Palmer, who had been in a mental state with his powers to increase size affected since imprisoned in the dome, sends out a broadcast message that he will pursue Deathstroke for Ryan Choi's murder. Ray then engages Deathstroke in an epic battle, but Ray is being pulled by the mysterious voice of Telos to fight opposite Angor universe's Barracuda. While Ray battles Barracuda, Ryan Choi suddenly appears and to be alive, and confronts him. Ryan explains that his death and consciousness had survived in the universe where the Atoms' masses are shifted to whenever they change size. Ryan then returns to the realm of the living after appropriating Ray's hand that Barracuda severed during their battle, to create a new body for him after they defeat Barracuda. Ray is hospitalized after losing his hand, and Deathstroke infiltrates the hospital and attempts to kill him, but Ryan interferes as they work together to defeat Deathstroke and restored Ray's hand.

The New 52
In September 2011, The New 52 rebooted DC's continuity. In this new timeline, Ray appears in Frankenstein: Agent of S.H.A.D.E. as S.H.A.D.E.'s science advisor, although he appears to have retained his abilities. His shrinking technology enables S.H.A.D.E. agents to enter and leave their microscopic headquarters, the Ant Farm. He later uses his size-shifting abilities to assist Superman in visiting the Bottle City of Kandor, during which he wears a protective suit similar to the Atom costume. At the end of this adventure he expresses an interest in becoming a superhero as the Atom. He subsequently assists Superman in costume during Superman's fight with Vandal Savage.

DC Rebirth
Subsequently, in the DC Rebirth reboot, on Earth-0, Ray Palmer is, by day, a professor at an Ivy League college and, by night, the experienced crime fighter The Atom. He reveals his secret identity to his friend and apprentice Ryan Choi, and enlists him for tech support during his adventures. After many adventures together, Ray disappears and Ryan is scolded when Ray cancels classes for the fifth day in a row. When Ryan goes to get Ray from his workshop where he has seemingly been confined for a week, he instead finds a video recording from Ray. In it he reveals he discovered a universe beyond the subatomic, a so-called Microverse while investigating a disruption in space and time, and within he found something that posed an existential threat to their universe. He asks Ryan, the only other person who knows how to use the Atom's technology and whom Ray trusts, to go into it, rescue him, and finish his work. Ray informs Ryan that upon arrival he will also meet with someone who he himself has encountered. He tries to warn Ryan about something, but the footage cuts out abruptly before he can finish. When Batman begins recruiting for his new Justice League of America, he chooses Ray as one of the members of the new league, however when he enters Ray's office he finds Ryan instead. Ryan explains to Batman about Ray's situation so he takes Ryan as Ray's successor.

Carter Hall, during his ongoing quest to reveal the mysteries of his past lives, is transported to the Microverse, where Ray has relocated. Together they recover a starship located on the living planet Moz-Ga which belonged to several of Hall's past lives.

Powers and abilities
Atom possesses the power to alter his size down to the subatomic level while retaining his natural strength level. This is accomplished by using the remnants of a white-dwarf star made into a belt buckle worn with his costume. Originally, he had to manipulate his abilities via the belt, and later with hand movements, before eventually syncing directly with his brain via mental commands. The Atom is one of the few heroes in the DC Universe that has 100% control over his body on the molecular level (Plastic Man being another), thus making him exponentially more powerful than he is often portrayed; he is limited only by his application of his powers. Some of the applications he has demonstrated include reducing his mass to glide through the air and increasing his mass to punch through concrete. He also demonstrated the ability to make his costume appear and disappear at will by shifting its atoms between this dimension and another.

During Countdown to Final Crisis, Palmer learned he could shrink down beyond the subatomic scale to traverse the Multiverse by slipping below the quantum layer beneath reality. He has been shown to be able to ride phone lines to his destination by dialing a number and traveling through the handset (his signature use of his power), and recently shrinking small enough to travel on photon signals through fiber optic cable.

Some of The Atom's more impressive feats include shrinking into Superman's atomic structure and manually compile his protonic minutia to generate Kryptonite radiation and defusing Black Lantern Al Pratt's Atomic Punch and resizing within him, ripping his body apart in the process.

Following the events of Zero Hour, the Atom gained the ability to also grow in size and internalizes his other abilities without the use of his white dwarf star-based apparatus. However, when returned to his natural age, these abilities were lost.

As a member of the Indigo Tribe, Ray possessed an indigo power ring powered by compassion, which provided him with flight, energy projection, and a protective force field. He also utilized a staff capable of duplicating the abilities of other wielders of the Emotional spectrum within range.

He has also shown the ability to allow others to shrink down with him if the situation requires it, such as when he shrank himself, Superman, Flash, Green Lantern, Wonder Woman and Plastic Man to repair the links between seven shattered subatomic particles, or shrinking Steel, Supergirl and Superboy to directly treat a kryptonite tumor in Superman's body. However, this ability is relatively limited; initially anyone other than himself who was shrunk would explode after two minutes if not returned to their normal size, although by the time he sent Superman's allies into the Man of Steel, he was able to extend this time to around an hour.

Palmer is exceptionally intelligent. He has a IQ of 140 and prior to acquiring his abilities, he had four PhDs under his belt. He is a world authority on physics, with other superheroes often consulting him for assistance with physics-related projects.

Although physics is his primary forte, he is proficient in various other scientific disciplines. He has proven to be a master of engineering, as he was able to design and build the A.T.O.M. He has also developed several other technologically sophisticated gadgets during his tenure as the CEO of Palmer Tech such as surgical nanobots, dispersal units, smartwatches, etc. He is an adept chemist as well, as he was able to analyze and modify Eobard Thawne's biomolecular enhancer to have lasting and more stable effects while in World War II, despite the formula initially being made from 22nd-century technology.

Additionally, he is in excellent physical condition, engaging in frequent exercise and workouts. He has a high level of experience with-hand-to-hand combat, having received training from various different Justice League members, namely Batman. Boxing and judo are his preferred fighting styles. He has also displayed proficiency in swordsmanship and acrobatics.

Supporting cast

 Adam Cray - The son of an assassinated senator, Adam Cray is approached by Ray Palmer to take up his mantle as the Atom to bring Micro/Squad into the open so Palmer can infiltrate their ranks and bring them to justice. Cray steals the size-changing belt given to Paul Hoben and joins the Suicide Squad. The plan works but at the cost of Cray's life.
 Hawkman - Meeting in the Justice League, Hawkman became Palmer's best friend.
 Jean Loring - Palmer's girlfriend when he became the Atom. He would go on to marry her but the two would divorce years later when Jean had an affair with fellow lawyer Paul Hoben. Jean would marry Hoben but the two would eventually divorce. In wake of the events of Identity Crisis, Jean and Ray would reconnect until it was discovered Jean was behind the murders therein and separated again.
 Laethwyn - Princess of the Morlaidhans that falls mutually in love with the Atom when he helps her reclaim her throne. She, like the rest of her people, are murdered by the CIA operatives under order of the Cabal.
 Loren Jupiter - A wealthy philanthropist that financed the original Teen Titans during their early years. He would return to help form another band of Teen Titans with his daughter Lilith when the alien race H'San Natall threatened Earth, largely the force behind Ray Palmer's membership in the group as its leader in the wake of Zero Hour.
 Major Mynah - A myna Palmer saves and brings to Hawkman to give it prosthetic wings to replace its severely damaged wings. The bird goes on to become the Atom's partner and steed.
 Maya - Queen of the Flower Spirits/Dryads from another dimension, after the Atom frees her people from the control of the Plant Master they become his friends and assist him occasionally. She later became friends with Floronic Man. 
 Norman Brawler - A close friend of Palmer's that authors his biography The Atom's Farewell where the Atom's identity is revealed to the world.
 Paul Hoben - Lawyer who had an affair with Jean Loring while she was married to Ray Palmer. After her divorce, she marries Paul with Ray's blessing. When Ray decides to remain in Morlaidh, he gives Paul his size-changing belt and the role as the protector of Ivy Town.
 Professor Alpheus V. Hyatt - A scientist and friend of Ray Palmer at Ivy University that invents a Time Pool, but the opening to it is remarkably small. As such, the Atom is the only person capable of using it to travel through time.

Rogues gallery
 Big Gang - A group of specialists that each take the title 'Big' for their specialties that target the largest/biggest of items to steal. Membership includes Big Deal (illusionist and expert in prestidigitation), Big Ben (timing specialist), Big Wig (master of disguise wigs), Big Bertha (strong woman), Big Shot (marksman), Big Cheese (who uses specially made cheeses with different properties), and led by Big Head.
 The Bug-Eyed Bandit - Bertram Larvan invented an army of mechanical insects and spiders to do his bidding as the Bug-Eyed Bandit.
 Chronos the Time-Thief - David Clinton was a criminal with perfect timing and developed an arsenal of time-based paraphernalia. As Chronos, he became the Atom's archenemy and would, in time, became an expert in time travel and time manipulation.
 The Colony - They started during the Cold War program using their connections, codenaming it Project Colony. The C.I.A. gathered a group of America's brightest scientific minds power of the United States. Project Colony quickly developed projects and weapons systems that over the next years. The original group changed over the decades, faces and minds were constantly being and handed an unlimited budget to explore and experiment. After the Cold War ended, the group and Project Colony was officially discontinued. However, the greatest minds the country had to offer were in the middle of new experiments and projects. They reformed as a private organization, now calling ourselves simply the Colony, and continued their work in secret to America's global and metahuman. Unfortunately, the global landscape grew increasingly unstable; tension grew within their ranks. The Colony was willing to sacrifice anything, including humans, for their mankind to come to fruition.
 Deathstroke the Terminator - Originally facing the mercenary as part of the Teen Titans and again when he protected Dr. Light, Palmer would help take down Deathstroke after he murdered his protégé Ryan Choi.
 Doctor Light - After Dr. Light escapes from prison, the warden asks the Atom to discover how he achieved such a feat. The Atom is able to recreate the escape and follows the villain to his hideout. Though captured, he manages to stop Light from his assault on the Justice League and brings him into custody. Later, the Atom would vote to lobotomize Light for his rape of Sue Dibny.
 Eddie Gordon - A petty criminal, Eddie Gordon stumbled upon the Bat-Knights of Elvaran, a race of miniature humanoids, in Giants Cavern and would manipulate them on several occasions to perform crimes for him.
 The Floronic Man - Exiled from an alternate dimension, Jason Woodrue would become the Plant Master and try to control plants to conquer Earth. One of the Atom's most frequent opponents, Woodrue would become a living plant able to control flora and take the name the Floronic Man. 
 Humbug the Reusable Man - In an attempt to create artificial intelligence, the Department of Scientific Investigation's Darwin Jones, Annetta Kaplan, and Anton Kraft created the computer Gestalt. However, the project took on a life all its own and the trio built a humanoid body for the emerging lifeform, giving birth to Humbug. Armed with an army of these artificial bodies endowed with super-strength, super-durability, and able to inflate/deflate, Humbug could jump between them at will with a murderous penchant for games.
 The Man in the Ion Mask - Masquerading as a modern-day Man in the Iron Mask, Bill Jameson wore a mask that emitted ion rays that when in the presence of Encephalonic waves (such as those his brother Ed's brain emitted) would black out those nearby and rob them. 
 Micro/Squad - A group of CIA operatives tasked with committing genocide on the Morlaidhan race in Operation: Fireball in hopes of rousing the absent Ray Palmer into returning to the agency as an operative. When Palmer learned of this, he shrank the operatives responsible to six-inch height (much to the pleasure of the CIA whom employed the group in Palmer's stead). The group, dubbed Micro/Squad, composed of Mr. Baily, Ms. Hubbard, Ginsburg, Sting, and led by Blacksnake, returned and believed they murdered Palmer in an explosion. When a new Atom emerged in the Suicide Squad, Blacksnake murdered him and claimed his size-changing belt to return to normal height. He followed this by killing Mr. Baily and Ms. Hubbard, crushing them in his hands. However, Ray switched places with Sting and revealed Ginsburg instead died in the explosion. Defeating Blacksnake, the villain is murdered by Task Force X II to bury evidence of the CIA's involvement in mass murder. Sting would return as a member of the Society.
 The Panther Gang - A group of criminals known for robbery. 
 Strobe - Employing a suit of technological armor, Strobe had super-strength and could fire concussion blasts and blinding flashes of light. When this did not pan out, he became Edg the Destroyer again using armor but in a samurai motif. Defeated again by the Atom, he has returned to his Strobe identity since.
 The Thinker - In a plot to steal without penalty of arrest, the Thinker robs artifacts of Earth-One and returns to his native Earth-Two where he cannot be prosecuted for his ill-gotten gains. This plot brings him into conflict with the Atoms of both worlds.
 Toyboy - Criminal ringleader Johnny Burns becomes the supervillain Toyboy when his mother experienced an accident that briefly endowed her with psychic powers, which in turn gave Toyboy telekinesis (which he uses to control toys) and super-strength. Mrs. Burns also created a psionic construct of Johnny that wanted to reform and when in the presence of Toyboy, Johnny was reborn as a man seeking redemption for his crimes.
 Wizardo the Great (fake) - Howard Crane wears an astronaut-like suit to blame Wizardo the Great for robberies during his Space Man act.

Other versions

The Dark Knight Strikes Again
Frank Miller portrayed Ray Palmer as a major player in Batman: The Dark Knight Strikes Again. He was taken prisoner by Lex Luthor and made to live in one of his own petri dishes for a period of years until his rescue by Catgirl. He was then instrumental in the liberation of Kandor, gaining access to the bottle by 'hiding' inside Lara- the daughter of Superman and Wonder Woman- when she confronted Brainiac, slipping inside the bottle to break it from the inside and allowing the Kryptonians within to gain superpowers to defeat Brainiac.

In The Dark Knight III: The Master Race, Palmer attempts to restore the natives of Kandor to their full height, but is instead tricked into reviving a twisted Kryptonian cult, whose leader proceeds to crush Palmer and Kandor.

League of Justice
Other re-imaginings of the Atom include an appearance in League of Justice, an Elseworlds story portraying the Justice League in a The Lord of the Rings-type story where the Atom was recast as a wizard/fortune teller called "Atomus The Palmer".

JLA: Age of Wonders
In JLA: Age of Wonder, Ray Palmer worked with a science consortium whose members at one point included Thomas Edison and Nikola Tesla.

JLA: Rock of Ages
In JLA: Rock of Ages, the Atom is part of what remains of the Justice League in an alternate future where Darkseid has taken control of the Earth. The Atom dies sacrificing himself to kill Darkseid, riding a burst of photons through the villain's invisible force field and into his optic nerve, then discharging white dwarf radiation into Darkseid's four-lobed brain.

JLA/Avengers
In JLA/Avengers, Ray appears first as taking the place of Wally West during the Justice League's mission to the Marvel Universe when he realizes that there is no Speed Force in the other reality. The Justice League arrives and battles a group of monsters while searching for the Ultimate Nullifier, but Ray stays behind after a brief confrontation with the Avengers, where he sees them meeting with Metron who gives a story different from the one given to the League by The Grandmaster. Intrigued at this turn of events, Ray jumped on Metron's chair, which took him to the Grandmaster's base. When Batman and Captain America arrive, having tracked Metron with the aid of equipment provided by the Fantastic Four, he shows them that while the Grandmaster is trying to stop Krona, his team in his game is the League, rather than his own universe's Avengers. When the Grandmaster merges the universes to stop Krona, Ray disappears until the two teams join up to go after Krona himself. Ray participates in the battle and ends up disappearing after Krona's defeat.

DC: The New Frontier
In DC: The New Frontier, Ray Palmer hasn't become the Atom yet but is a leading scientist in using lenses to shrink matter. However, in his experiments this matter would then explode. His technology was instrumental in destroying the Centre when the Flash bathes the alien in the beam and it explodes. Later, in the epilogue, the Atom is shown in a group shot.

JLA: The Nail
In JLA: The Nail and Another Nail, Atom often stands on Flash's shoulder, following Hawkman's death. He is shown infiltrating the Thinker's base to investigate the possibility that he was involved in the conspiracy against other heroes, but discovered upon entering the base that the Thinker was dead after he stumbled upon clues to the true mastermind's plans, the villain having been killed by a brainwashed Metamorpho (The only other person capable of infiltrating the Thinker's security). In the sequel, the Flash and the Atom are briefly sent to the Earth of the Crime Syndicate of America during the dimensional anomalies caused by the limbo cell, with the Atom observing that the Syndicate's tendency to steal everything they have prevents them from understanding the true nature of their current threat. Despite their efforts, the two only return to their world after the Limbo Cell has been defeated.

Countdown to Final Crisis
In Countdown to Final Crisis, The Search for Ray Palmer and Countdown: Arena (2007), a number of alternate versions of Ray are introduced.

 On Earth-6, Ray Palmer has developed solar powers and taken the name of superhero the Ray.
 Ray's counterpart on Earth-11 is a woman on a gender-reversed world.
 The Jessica Palmer of Earth-15 is a young physicist on a world of efficient second- and third-generation heroes.
 On Earth-30 in the Superman: Red Son limited series, Ray is an American scientist living in Russia.
 On Earth-51, a younger Ray's life is cut short during a dangerous experiment. This Ray never specialized in size-manipulation or became a superhero, but served as the JLA's resident genius and was uniquely born with a superhuman immune system.

Flashpoint
In the alternate timeline of the Flashpoint event, the Atom lost a leg to radiation poisoning and became a corrections officer in Doom Prison, acting as a controller of Amazo. During the prison break, the Atom's control is pulled out by Eel O'Brian and Heat Wave who then force him to retrieve their weapons. After the Atom does it, Heat Wave crushes his skull with his fingers.

In other media

Television
 Ray Palmer / Atom appears in The Superman/Aquaman Hour of Adventure, voiced by Pat Harrington Jr..
 Ray Palmer / Atom appears in Super Friends, voiced by Wally Burr.
 Ray Palmer / Atom appears in Justice League of America, portrayed by John Kassir.
 Ray Palmer / Atom appears in Justice League Unlimited, voiced by John C. McGinley. This version is a member of the Justice League.
 Ray Palmer / Atom appears in the Batman: The Brave and the Bold episode "Sword of the Atom!", voiced by Peter Scolari. This version was the original Atom and mentored Ryan Choi before eventually retiring to the Amazon, where he entered a relationship with Princess Laethwyn of the Morlaidhans.
 Ray Palmer / Atom appears in Young Justice, voiced by Jason Marsden. This version is a member of the Justice League who is assisted by Bumblebee.
 Ray Palmer / Atom appears in the DC Nation Shorts segment "Sword of the Atom", voiced again by Jason Marsden.
 Ray Palmer / Atom appears in Justice League Action, voiced by Jerry O'Connell.
 Ray Palmer / Atom appears in the Teen Titans Go! episode "Strength of a Grown Man", voiced by Patton Oswalt.

Arrowverse

Ray Palmer / Atom appears in media set in the Arrowverse, portrayed by Brandon Routh. This version's suit was originally designed as a combat exosuit dubbed O.M.A.C., has an I.Q. of 140, 4 PhDs, is the CEO of Palmer Technologies (formerly Queen Consolidated), and was married to Anna Loring before she was killed by Deathstroke's men. Palmer first appears as a recurring character in the live-action TV series Arrow before making guest appearances in the live-action spin-off The Flash and the animated CW Seed series Vixen, as well as becoming a main character in the live-action spin-off Legends of Tomorrow.

Film
 Ray Palmer appears in Justice League: The New Frontier, voiced by an uncredited Corey Burton.
 An alternate universe version of Ray Palmer appears in Justice League: Gods and Monsters, voiced by Dee Bradley Baker. This version was a member of Lex Luthor's "Project Fair Play", a weapons program contingency meant to be used to destroy their version of the Justice League if necessary, before Palmer is killed by a Metal Man designed by Will Magnus to frame Wonder Woman.
 Ray Palmer / Atom appears in Teen Titans Go! To the Movies, voiced by Patton Oswalt.

Video games
 Ray Palmer appears in Injustice: Gods Among Us as a non-player character in the Insurgency headquarters stage and a playable character in the Joker's S.T.A.R. Labs minigames.
 Ray Palmer appears as a playable character in Lego Batman 3: Beyond Gotham, voiced by Troy Baker.
 The Arrowverse incarnation of Ray Palmer / Atom appears in Lego DC Super-Villains, voiced by Brandon Routh. He appears in the "DC TV Super-Heroes" DLC pack.
 Ray Palmer / Atom appears in Scribblenauts Unmasked: A DC Comics Adventure.

Miscellaneous
 Jessica Palmer appears in Smallville Season 11 as an associate of Superman, among others.
 Ray Palmer / Atom appears in the Injustice: Gods Among Us prequel comic.
 Ray Palmer / Atom appears in the Injustice 2 prequel comic as a member of Batman's Insurgency working to repair the damage caused by the Regime.

Collected editions

Reception
This version of Atom was ranked as the 144th Greatest Comic Book Character of All Time by Wizard magazine. IGN also ranked the Atom as the 64th Greatest Comic Book Hero of All Time stating; "Of all the superheroes out here, Dr. Ray Palmer might be one of the most brilliant tortured souls imaginable."

See also
 Ant-Man

References

1961 comics debuts
2010 comics debuts
Characters created by Gardner Fox
Characters created by Gil Kane
Characters created by Julius Schwartz
Comics characters introduced in 1961
DC Comics American superheroes
DC Comics male superheroes
DC Comics scientists
Atom
DC Comics characters who are shapeshifters
Fictional characters who can change size
Fictional nuclear physicists
Fictional professors
Fictional swordfighters in comics

da:Atomet
pt:Eléktron
sv:Atom (serier)